Dar al-Shukr (House of Gratefulness) is a royal palace located in Sana'a, Yemen. It is located near Qubbat al-Mutawakkil Mosque dome in Tahrir Square in the city centre.

After the fall of the monarchy in the 1960s, it housed the National Museum of Yemen. After that it houses the Museum of Traditional Arts and Crafts.

See also 
 Dar al-Bashair
 Dar al-Hajar
 Dar as-Sa'd

Buildings and structures in Sanaa
Palaces in Yemen
Yemeni monarchy